The Skomer vole (Myodes glareolus skomerensis) is a subspecies of bank vole endemic to the island of Skomer, off the west coast of Wales. The bank vole was probably introduced by humans at some time after the last glaciation. It is one of four small mammal species on Skomer. There are approximately 20,000 voles on the island. The vole's main predators are owls, but it is also eaten by other predators, including common kestrel, common buzzard and peregrine falcon. Like other voles they are short-lived, surviving to around 18 months old at most.

Discovery
The Skomer vole was discovered by Robert Drane (d. 1914), a pharmacist from Swansea who was a founding member of the Cardiff Naturalists Society in 1867, and at sometime its president, and also an authority on porcelain and honorary curator of Cardiff Museum.

References

Myodes
Rodents of Europe
Endemic fauna of Wales
Environment of Pembrokeshire